40 Green Elephants is a Slovenian animation children's television series about 40 green elephants. Cartoon was created by Slovenian screenwriter Franček Rudolf. Original run and production company was at the same time produced by RTV Ljubljana.

Episodes

External links
40 Green Elephants at Slovenian Film Fund

Slovenian television series
1980s Slovenian television series
1981 Slovenian television series debuts
1981 Slovenian television series endings
Radiotelevizija Slovenija original programming